Lisewo  is a village in the Kuyavian-Pomeranian Voivodeship in north-central Poland. The village is the seat of Gmina Lisewo, a part of Chełmno County. Lisewo is situated 33 km north of Toruń and 20 km east of Chełmno along an important transport and communication route. The closest towns are Chełmża (13 km) and Wąbrzeźno (17 km).

Lisewo municipality spreads over an area of 8620 ha and is inhabited by 5,500 people, of which most are farmers. Local agriculture is dominated by individual farming. 80% of regional benefit is gained by agriculture, whereas only 0.3% derives from forestry.

History
The oldest known mention of the village comes from 1293.

During the German occupation (World War II), Lisewo was one of the sites of executions of Poles, carried out by the Germans in 1939 as part of the Intelligenzaktion. Local Polish teachers were murdered by the Germans in a massacre of Poles committed in nearby Klamry, also as part of the Intelligenzaktion.

The village and the municipality

From an administrative point of view, Lisewo is a community.
 
After World War II in February 1945, the voivodship of Pomorskie was restored. Its seat was first of all situated in Toruń and then in April moved to Bydgoszcz. At the same time the district of Chełmno was segregated into new divisions and communities.

This state was kept until 1954, when further districts were divided into smaller units. Krusin and Lisewo both were counted to these small units. The next territorial-administrative reform of the voivodship of Bydgoszcz occurred in 1973. Communities were reintroduced and rural units deleted. Lisewo regained its status of a community. In 1975, the Toruń Voivodeship was founded, and Lisewo was one of the 49 municipalities belonging to it.

The village itself occurs in the oldest known documents under the name of Lissow in 1293, Lissaw/Lysaw in 1408 and Leysaw, Leissan, Lysow, Lissowo in 1530.

Sports
The local football club is Victoria Lisewo. It competes in the lower leagues.

Transport
The north-south A1 motorway (Gdańsk-Cieszyn) passes east of the village and one of its exits is located there.

Notable residents 
 Georg Jauer (1896–1971), general

References

External links
Official website of the Lisewo Municipality
Project Team of Lisewo, Friends of Lisewo's Community Association
Janusz Korczak Elementary School in Lisewo
Gymnasium school in Lisewo
The Getto (Ghetto) music band from Lisewo

Lisewo